The Madonna della Nieve or Chiesa della Madonnina is a late-baroque and early-neoclassical-style, Roman Catholic church located on Via Madonnina in Acqui Terme, province of Alessandria, region of Piedmont, Italy.

History 
The church was begun in 1727 and completed in 1766. While the façade is sober, the interior is decorated with rococo richness.

References 

Roman Catholic churches in Acqui Terme
18th-century Roman Catholic church buildings in Italy
Roman Catholic churches completed in 1766
Neoclassical architecture in Piedmont
Neoclassical church buildings in Italy